Union councils of Jessore District are the smallest rural administrative and local government units in Jessore District of Bangladesh. There are 8 upazilas in Jessore district with 00 Union councils. The list are below:

Abhaynagar Upazila
Abhaynagar Upazila has 8 unions, 000 mauzas, and 000 villages.
 Prembag Union
 Sundoli Union
 Chalishia Union
 Payra Union
 Sreedhorpur Union
 Baghutia Union
 Shubharara Union
 Siddhipasha Union

Bagherpara Upazila
Bagherpara has 9 Unions/Wards, 156 Mauzas/Mahallas, and 191 villages.
Unions Name
 Johorpur Union
 Bandobila Union
 Raipur Union
 Narikelbaria Union
 Dhalgram Union
 Dohakula Union
 Dorajhat Union
 Basuari Union
 Jamdia Union

Chaugachha Upazila
Chowgacha Union has 11 Unions/Wards, 149 Mauzas/Mahallas, and 166 villages.
 Fulsara Union
 Pashapole Union
 Singhajhuli Union
 Dhuliani Union
 Chaugachha Union
 Jagadishpur Union
 Patibila Union
 Hakimpur Union
 Swarupdaha Union
 Narayanpur Union
 Sukhpukuria Union

Jhikargacha Upazila
Jhikargacha Upazila has 11 unions, 164 mouzas and 179 villages.
 Ganganandapur Union
 Magura Union
 Shimulia Union
 Gadkhali Union
 Panisara Union
 Jhikargacha Union
 Nabharan Union
 Nirbaskhola Union
 Hajirbag Union
 Shankarpur Union
 Bankra Union

Keshabpur Upazila
Keshabpur Upazila has 9 union parishads, 142 mouzas and 143 villages.
 Trimohini Union
 Sagardari Union
 Majidpur Union
 Bidyanandakati Union
 Mongolkot Union
 Keshabpur Union
 Panjia Union
 Sufalakati Union
 Gaurighona Union
 Satbaria Union
 Hasanpur Union

Jessore Sadar Upazila
Jessore Sadar Upazila has 9 union parishads, 142 mouzas and 143 villages.
 Hoibotpur Union
 Lebutala Union
 Ichali Union
 Arabpur Union
 Upashahar Union
 Kachua Union
 Kashimpur Union
 Curomonkati Union
 Chanchra Union
 Norendrapur Union
 Noapara Union
 Fatepur Union
 Bosundia Union
 Ramnagar Union
 Deara Union

Manirampur Upazila
 Bhojgati Union
 Chaluahati Union
 Dhakuria Union
 Durbadanga Union
 Haridaskati Union
 Hariharnagar Union
 Jhanpa Union
 Kashimnagar Union
 Khanpur Union
 Khedapara Union
 Kultia Union
 Manirampur Union
 Maswimnagar Union
 Monoharpur Union
 Nehalpur Union
 Rohita Union
 Shyamkur Union

Sharsha Upazila
 Bagachra Union
 Bahadurpur Union
 Benapole Union
 Dihi Union
 Goga Union
 Kayba Union
 Lakshmanpur Union
 Nizampur Union
 Putkhali Union
 Sharsha Union
 Ulshi Union

References 

Local government in Bangladesh